Aphonopelma catalina is a species of spiders in the family Theraphosidae, found in Arizona in the United States.

References

catalina
Spiders described in 2016
Spiders of the United States